Tetradecane  is an alkane hydrocarbon with the chemical formula CH3(CH2)12CH3.

Tetradecane has 1858 structural isomers.

See also
 Higher alkanes
 List of isomers of tetradecane

References

External links
 Material Safety Data Sheet for Tetradecane 
 http://www.ars-grin.gov/cgi-bin/duke/chemical.pl?TETRADECANE

Alkanes